New English Shakespeare Company is an English theatre company founded in 2019 by producer Jamie Hendry to present modern takes on the works of William Shakespeare on a global level. Its inaugural production of Much Ado About Nothing was directed by Derek Bond and opened at the Dubai Opera in September 2019 before embarking on an international tour.

Productions

Much Ado About Nothing 
Much Ado About Nothing premiered at the Dubai Opera in September 2019, directed by Derek Bond, with designs by James Perkins, lighting design by James Whiteside, music by Tayo Akinbode and movement by Lucie Pankhurst. 

The production was well received with Time Out reviewing it as "Nothing short of phenomenal".

References

2019 establishments in England